Access All Areas: Unlocked is a British television reality series that airs on Disney Channel. The series premiered in the United Kingdom on 19 September 2015.

Episodes

Series overview

Season 1 (2015)

References

British reality television series
Disney Channel (British and Irish TV channel) original programming